Antiblemma solina is a moth of the family Noctuidae. It is found in Neotropics.

References

Moths described in 1790
Catocalinae
Noctuidae of South America
Moths of South America